Mphanda Nkuwa Dam is a proposed hydroelectric dam on the Zambezi River in Mozambique. Its power station would have a capacity of 1,500 megawatts.

The estimated cost of the project is US$4.2 billion. Once the dam is completed, it is expected that most of the generated power will be sold to South Africa, because of the lack of transmission infrastructure in Mozambique.

The proposed dam is highly controversial because it would force the relocation of 1,400 families, and affect the livelihoods of a further 200,000 people downriver. Because the dam would be operated on a peaking basis, large daily fluctuations in river flow would ruin existing irrigation systems and affect aquaculture in the river's extensive delta. The United Nations has described this project as the "least environmentally acceptable major dam project in Africa."

In 2015, the Mozambique government announced it would start construction of the dam. The construction was contracted to Camargo Corrêa of Brazil, INSITEC of Mozambique, and Electricidade de Moçambique. In 2020, Mozambique President Filipe Nyusi wished construction of the dam started before 2024.

In 2022, the International Finance Corporation (IFC), a subsidiary of the World Bank Group, signed agreements with the Mozambican government, indicating willingness to participate in the development of this renewable energy project.

Developments
In October 2022, the Mozambican government short=listed seven companies and consortia, who will be allowed to visit the site and then formulate detailed designs and plans to develop the dam and power station. The table below, outlines the entities vying for the engineering, procurement and construction (EPC) contract for his project.

See also
 Batoka Gorge Hydroelectric Power Station

References

External links
 Mphanda Nkuwa Hydropower Project Timeline and All You Need to Know As of 17 December 2021.

Dams in Mozambique
Gravity dams
Proposed hydroelectric power stations
Proposed renewable energy power stations in Mozambique